Ian Martyn Boserio (born 15 March 1952) is a New Zealand rower.

He was born in 1952 in Lower Hutt, New Zealand. He was a member of the Petone Rowing Club. He represented New Zealand at the 1976 Summer Olympics, and is listed as Olympian athlete 336 by the New Zealand Olympic Committee.

Boserio earned a BSc degree in Geology from Victoria University of Wellington in 1974, and an honours degree in geophysics in 1980. He works in the oil and gas exploration industry.

References

1952 births
Living people
New Zealand male rowers
Rowers at the 1976 Summer Olympics
Olympic rowers of New Zealand
Sportspeople from Lower Hutt
Victoria University of Wellington alumni
Corporate executives